The Virginia Pumpkin Festival is an annual event held from 2007 to 2019 and since 2021 in the town of Virginia, County Cavan in the Republic of Ireland. The festival takes place every bank holiday weekend at Halloween at the end of October.

History

The festival began in 2007 with crowds of up to ten thousand. On the Friday night the whole town was suddenly pitch black, before being completely lit up by candle light from pumpkin lanterns which were placed throughout the town. The events continued on Saturday with a variety of activities for all ages which included pumpkin olympics, arts and crafts exhibitions and music from local band "RHETOFIRE".  Then followed the Pumpkin King and Queen competition when perfectly dressed Ladies and Gentlemen representing the public houses in the town were interviewed, Avril Soden and Martin Tynan were crowned as king and queen.  On the Sunday afternoon the main event of the festival took place, pumpkin weigh in followed by a parade. The winner of the first ever Virginia Pumpkin Competition was Ed Molloy from Co. Longford.This year, the Festival was launched by famous chef Richard Corrigan.

2020 saw no festival.

Festival
The Whirlygig Fire parade and was followed by a firework display.
Throughout the years the event has grown and grown just like the size of the pumpkins which enter the main competition of the weekend, Virginia town has welcomed growers from Ireland, Britain and Italy to attempt to win a cash prize  the pumpkins are judged on their, size and shape and colour. They also included a live weigh-in of Ireland's heaviest pumpkins. The events which took place last year (2007) happened again but to make it distinctive, the organisers produced other attraction for the weekend in 2008. Some of these were a fancy dress Halloween party, kids treasure hunt, and even cookery demonstrations.  They also added such events as the teddy bear picnic and with live performances from a wide range of acts, such as the music like Shane MacGowan, Sharon Shannon and Mundy entertained crowds in the Pumpkin Marquee. There was also a street performance from the Whirligig theatre group who travelled from Co Donegal. In  2009  Bell X1 performed over the weekend and there was also music from Country music singers Declan Nerney and Philomena Begley at the Farmers' Dance in the Pumpkin Marquee as well.

References 

http://www.independent.ie/national-news/town-lights-up-for-pumpkin-fete-1510087.html  By Senan Hogan Saturday 25 October 2008
http://www.independent.ie/travel/inside-ireland/10-scariest-halloween-thrillers-1923646.html
By Denise Clarke Monday 26 October 2009  http://www.independent.ie/national-news/thrills-and-spills-at-pumpkin-festival-1924393.html
http://www.independent.ie/national-news/pumpkin-up-the-volume-halloween-festival-fun-1510790.html

External links 
Cole P., Hurley J., Great Pumpkins: Tricks and Treats for Halloween, 2003, Chronicle Books.
 
 

Festivals in Ireland
Culture in County Cavan
Festivals established in 2007
Halloween events
Pumpkin festivals
Autumn events in the Republic of Ireland
2007 establishments in Ireland